Leonhard Euler Telescope, or the Swiss EULER Telescope, is a national, fully automatic  reflecting telescope, built and operated by the Geneva Observatory. The telescope, which saw its first light on 12 April 1998, is named after Swiss mathematician Leonhard Paul Euler.

The Euler telescope uses the CORALIE instrument to search for exoplanets. In addition, the telescope uses the multi-purpose EulerCam (ecam), a high precision photometry instrument, and a smaller, piggyback mounted telescope, called "Pisco". Its first discovery was a planet in orbit around Gliese 86, determined to be a hot Jupiter with an orbital period of only 15.8 earth days and about four times the mass of Jupiter. Since then, many other exoplanets have been discovered or examined in follow-up observations.

Together with the Mercator Telescope, Euler was part of the Southern Sky extrasolar Planet search Programme, which has discovered numerous extrasolar planets. It has also been frequently employed for follow-up characterization to determine the mass of exoplanets discovered by the Wide Angle Search for Planets, SuperWASP.

Instruments 

The CORALIE spectrograph is an echelle- type spectrograph used for astronomy. It  is a copy of  the  ELODIE spectrograph used by Michel Mayor and Didier Queloz  to detect the planet orbiting a star .  In April 1998 it was built and installed   at the Euler Telescope. Later in 2007 it was upgraded by Didier Queloz and his team to increase its performances to support Wide Angle Search for Planets program and Next-Generation Transit Survey. The instrument is optimized to measure Doppler effect  on a star's electromagnetic spectrum with great precision to detect the gravitational tug of an  exoplanet orbiting around it. It also known as "radial velocity" or "wobble" method, is an indirect detection method. The mass of the planet can be estimated from these measurements. 

The spectrograph participates in the Southern Sky extrasolar Planet search Programme initiated  by Michel Mayor

In 2010 visible camera EulerCam was installed by Didier Queloz. Camera main  objective  was to measure planet by  transit method  by  supporting  ground base program such as  Wide Angle Search for Planets . The size of an exoplanet can be estimated using the transit method. By combining the measured size and mass from both methods, it can be determined whether the observed exoplanet is gaseous or rocky.

Characteristics 

The resolution of CORALIE is fixed at R = 50,000 with a 3 pixel sampling. The detector CCD is 2k X 2k with a 15 micrometer pixel size.

Discovered exoplanets 

First  five planetary object  discovered using CORALIE are

Gallery

Video

See also 
 ELODIE spectrograph
 List of largest optical telescopes in the 20th century
 Stéphane Udry
 WASP-15

References

External links 

 ESO La Silla 1.2m Leonhard Euler Telescope
 Southern Sky extrasolar Planet search Programme
 The CORALIE survey for southern extrasolar planets
 www.exoplanets.ch
 University of Geneva – The Geneva Observatory
 daviddarling.info /Euler
 ESO press release: 4 May 2000

Optical telescopes
European Southern Observatory
Spectrographs
Astronomical instruments
Telescope instruments
Exoplanet search projects
Articles containing video clips